Emphyteusis (Greek: implanting) is a contract for land that allows the holder the right to the enjoyment of a property, often in perpetuity, on condition of proper care, payment of tax and rent. The right encompasses assignment and of descent.

History
Emphyteusis originated in Ancient Greece . In the early Roman Empire it was initially granted by the state for the purposes of agriculture or development. In essence it was a long-term lease of an imperial domain for a rental in kind. The title existing before emphyteusis was ius in agro vectigali. The emphyteusis gave the lease-holder (emphyteuta) rights similar to those of a proprietor, although the real owner remained the person to whom the rent (canon or pensio) was paid. The tenant gained most of the rights of the owner. Accordingly, he could maintain actio vectigalis in rem against any one to recover possession of the land thus leased. Under certain circumstances, the land returned to the owner, as in the case of the death of the emphyteuta intestate, non-payment of the rent or taxes for three years (or two years in case of land held of the Church), lapse of time if a term was fixed in the original agreement, contractus emphyteuseos, which was a specific contract and neither an ordinary lease nor a sale. The rights of the emphyteuta embraced the full use of the land and its products and were alienable and transferable by testament or ab intestato.

Emphyteusis is still in use in countries such as Sri Lanka, Germany, Canada, Portugal, France, Italy, the Netherlands, and Malta and, until relatively recently, in Scotland.

See also
 Ground rent
 Emphyteutic lease
 Leasehold estate
 Perpetual usufruct

References

Civil law (legal system)
Real property law